The Murphy Yukon is a Canadian amateur-built aircraft, produced by Murphy Aircraft of Chilliwack, British Columbia, introduced at the AirVenture show in 2007. The aircraft is supplied as a kit for amateur construction.

The design is derived from the Murphy SR2500 Super Rebel and Murphy Moose.

Design and development
The Yukon was designed as a bush aircraft for fishing and camping flights, but with lower power and thus lower fuel consumption over the radial engine-powered Murphy Moose, making it more economical to operate. Design goals included simple jig-less construction, good cruise speed and docile low speed handling characteristics.

The aircraft features a strut-braced high-wing, a four-seats-in-side-by-side configuration enclosed cabin accessed by doors, fixed tricycle landing gear or conventional landing gear and a single engine in tractor configuration. The design features a large cargo compartment with a separate door for access.

The aircraft is made from semi-monocoque 6061-T6 aluminum sheet construction, with pre-punched holes from a numerical control design. The standard engines used are the  Lycoming O-360  and the  Lycoming IO-390 four-stroke powerplants.

The aircraft is available as a complete kit, a fast build kit, or as three component sub-kits that can be purchased separately over time. These consist of a tail kit, wing kit and fuselage kit.

The kit is available in both nosewheel or taildragger configurations. The aircraft can also be mounted on straight or amphibious floats and skis.

Operational history
In a 2008 review, Aero-News Network stated, "It's an adaptable bird, none-the-less, due to a "larger than life" passenger cabin and flexible seating arrangements. With all four seats in place, there is still sufficient room for two tents, coolers, chairs and camping gear for four. Removing the rear seat opens a HUGE area within which you can load items from stretchers to bicycles, or even use as sleeping accommodations!"

By January 2019, one example had been registered in the United States with the Federal Aviation Administration and two with Transport Canada.

Specifications (Yukon)

References

External links 
 

2000s Canadian civil utility aircraft
Homebuilt aircraft
High-wing aircraft
Single-engined tractor aircraft
Yukon
Aircraft first flown in 2007